Cupressus forbesii, now reclassified by some as Hesperocyparis forbesii, and with the common names Tecate cypress or Forbes' cypress, is a species of cypress native to southwestern North America.

Distribution
Cupressus forbesii is native to montane chaparral and woodlands habitats in the western Peninsular Ranges. The tree is found only in the Santa Ana Mountains of Orange County and in San Diego County within Southern California, and in northern Baja California state of Mexico.

The northernmost stand, in Orange County, which comprises a large area on the upper limits of Coal Canyon and on Sierra Peak in the Santa Ana Mountains, burned in a 2006 wildfire. Very few mature trees survived but regeneration is occurring by the hundreds to thousands. However another wildfire before trees are able to reach cone-producing age, which can be quite old for this species, could extirpate the stand.

Description
Cupressus forbesii reaches , and is usually without dominant terminal shoot resulting in a multi-trunked tree. The foliage ranges from rich light green to green, and seed cones are dark brown, measuring 20–32 mm.

Taxonomy
Cupressus forbesii has in the past been referred to as Cupressus guadalupensis var. forbesii. This taxonomy has been somewhat controversial, as morphology and molecular testing have both shown Cupressus guadalupensis to be genetically distinct enough from Cupressus forbesii to warrant being placed in its own species. Cupressus guadalupensis is endemic to Guadalupe Island off Baja California, two hundred fifty miles away from any C. forbesii stands. Molecular testing has shown Cupressus guadalupensis to be slightly more closely related to Cupressus stephensonii.

Major differences between Tecate cypress (Cupressus forbesii) and Guadalupe cypress (Cupressus guadalupensis) are: 
Guadalupe cypress, when mature, makes a much more massive and taller tree than Tecate cypress. 
Guadalupe cypress has glaucous, somewhat blue-tinted foliage, while Tecate cypress has very green foliage. 
Guadalupe cypress cones will open without fire, while Tecate cypress cones differ from any other species of California Cypress, in that even once disconnected from the parent tree, they will not open without heat.

Ecology
The Tecate cypress is the only plant on which the rare Thorne's Hairstreak (Callophrys gryneus thornei) lays its eggs.

Cultivation
Cupressus forbesii has proven to be a successful specimen tree, tolerant of the climate of Coastal California, and its cool temperatures and humidity, where other inland-growing cypress species: such as Cupressus macnabiana have done poorly in these conditions. A Tecate Cypress planted at the San Francisco Botanical Garden is showing vigor and produces viable cones at forty years of age.

References

Further reading
Little, D.P. 2006. Evolution and circumscription of the true cypresses (Cupressaceae: Cupressus). Systematic Botany 31(3): 461–480. 
Wolf, C. B. & Wagener, W. E. (1948). The New World cypresses. El Aliso 1: 195–205.

External links
 Calflora Database: Hesperocyparis forbesii (Tecate cypress) — current classification.
 Jepson eFlora (TJM2) treatment for Hesperocyparis forbesii
The Gymnosperm Database:  Cupressus forbesii
Cupressus forbesii/Hesperocyparis forbesii — U.C. Photos Gallery

forbesii
Flora of California
Trees of Baja California
Trees of the Southwestern United States
Natural history of the California chaparral and woodlands
Natural history of the Peninsular Ranges
Natural history of San Diego County, California
San Ysidro Mountains
Plants described in 1922
Taxa named by Willis Linn Jepson
Garden plants of North America
Drought-tolerant trees
Ornamental trees